The 2019 Andhra Pradesh Legislative Assembly elections were held in the Indian state of Andhra Pradesh on 11 April 2019 for constituting the fifteenth Legislative Assembly in the state. They were held alongside the 2019 Indian general election.

The YSR Congress Party won the election in a landslide, winning 151 of the 175 seats, with the incumbent Telugu Desam Party winning just 23. The Jana Sena Party entered the legislature with one seat, while the Congress and Bharatiya Janata Party failed to win any seats. YSRCP's 151-seat win (or 86%) is the largest majority government (in % terms) in the history of Andhra Pradesh, even surpassing TDP's 226-seat victory (or 77%) and equal if number of seats contested is only considered (216 out of 251) in the Undivided 1994 election 

Y. S. Jagan Mohan Reddy was unanimously voted as Legislature leader of the YSR Congress Party, and was invited to form the government by the Governor of Andhra Pradesh and Telangana, E. S. L. Narasimhan. This was the second assembly in Andhra Pradesh after the bifurcation of the state into Andhra Pradesh and Telangana.

Previous Assembly 

In the 2014 Andhra Pradesh Assembly election, sethe Telugu Desam Party (TDP), led by chief N. Chandrababu Naidu, in alliance with the Jana Sena Party (JSP), led by chief Pawan Kalyan, and the Bharatiya Janata Party (BJP), emerged as the single largest party. With 88 seats required to win a majority, the alliance won 103 out of the available 175 seats. Mr. Naidu was invited to form the government as part of the fourteenth chief minister of Andhra Pradesh by the then Governor of Andhra Pradesh and Telangana E. S. L. Narasimhan. It was the first Assembly in Andhra Pradesh after the bifurcation of the state into Andhra Pradesh and Telangana.

Background 
Y.S.Jagan Mohan Reddy, who was the leader of the main opposition in the Andhra Pradesh Assembly, launched his 3,648-km-long  Praja Sankalpa Yatra on 6 November 2017. In this Padayatra, Reddy launched an attack on the failed promises and corruption of the ruling TDP. He covered more than 130 out of the 175 assembly constituencies in the state, from YSR Ghat in Idupulapaya in Kadapa to Ichchapuram in Srikakulam district. During his padayatra, he addressed 124 public meetings. Meanwhile, JSP leader Pawan Kalyan hurled allegations of corruption against the ruling TDP and Nara Lokesh, son of Chandrababu Naidu. He also accused the BJP of inflicting injustice on Andhra Pradesh over the promised Special Category Status. JSP subsequently broke the alliance with the TDP. The TDP also withdrew from the National Democratic Alliance (NDA) in March 2018 over Special Category Status Issue. The ruling TDP contested the 2019 assembly elections on its own. The JSP and the BJP also contested independently in the 2019 assembly elections. In the four-cornered contest, the YSRCP led by Y. S. Jagan Mohan Reddy swept the polls.

Schedule of election

Election day 
The election was held in a single phase on 11 April for 175 assemblies and 25 parliamentary constituencies. A 79.88% voter turnout was recorded by the end of the election day, which was 1.92% higher than the 2014 Andhra Pradesh Legislative Assembly election. 1,55,45,211 Male and 1,57,87,759 Female voters cast their votes in the election. Overall 3,13,33,631 of a possible 3,93,45,717 voters participated in the election.

The highest turnout of 85.93% was recorded in Prakasam district followed by Guntur district with 82.37%, while Visakhapatnam district recorded the lowest turnout of 73.67%. Addanki constituency recorded the highest voter turnout of 89.82% voting and Visakhapatnam West constituency registered the lowest turnout of 58.19%.

Parties and alliances











Candidates

Results 
The results were announced on 23 May 2019, the day of the counting of ballots. YSRCP won the polls by winning a record 151 seats out of 175 seats, their best poll performance to date. YSRCP won all MLA seats in the districts of Kadapa, Kurnool, Nellore, and Viazayanagram. Furthermore, they lost only 3 seats (Kuppam, Hindupur, Uravakonda) in the Rayalaseema region. From the 26 ministers in the ruling TDP Cabinet only 3 ministers, Nimmakayala Chinarajappa, Ganta Srinivasa Rao, and Kinjarapu Atchannaidu, were able to win. The JSP+ alliance won only a single seat of Razole, while the leader of the alliance Pawan Kalyan lost both the seats in Gajuwaka and Bhimavaram. The national parties - Congress and BJP - were not able to win a single seat.

TDP candidates lost their security deposit in 1 out of 175 seats contested, JSP candidates lost security deposit in 121 out of 137 seats contested, BJP candidates lost security deposit in 173 out of 173 seats contested, Congress candidates lost security deposit in 174 out of 174 seats contested.

Results by party

Results by district

Results by constituency

See also 
 Elections in Andhra Pradesh
 List of constituencies of the Andhra Pradesh Legislative Assembly

References

External links 
 Andhra Pradesh Legislative Assembly Election 2019 Website

Andhra Pradesh
State Assembly elections in Andhra Pradesh
2010s in Andhra Pradesh